Marco Chiosa (born 19 November 1993) is an Italian professional footballer who plays as a centre back for  club Virtus Entella.

Club career
Chiosa began his career in the Torino youth system, and played two seasons with the Primavera squad in 2010–11 and 2011–12. He was first called up to the senior team on 27 May 2012, an away game against AlbinoLeffe, without making his official debut.

In the next two seasons he was transferred on loan to Nocerina in Lega Pro and Bari in Serie B. In Apulia he made his debut in Serie B on 23 August 2013, an away game against Reggina, 0–0.

In the 2014–15 season, he was loaned to Avellino. On 1 July 2015, the loan expired and he returned to Turin; however on 13 July he returned to Avellino for another season.

In the 2016–17 season, he was loaned to Perugia, but was recalled in January and loaned to Novara. In June 2017, Novara purchased him outright for €500,000.

On 27 January 2019, he signed with Virtus Entella.

International career
He has earned call-ups for Italy at under-19 and under-20 levels. On 10 January 2014, he was called up to the under-21 side by Luigi Di Biagio.

References

External links

1993 births
Living people
People from Cirié
Footballers from Piedmont
Italian footballers
Association football fullbacks
Serie B players
Serie C players
Torino F.C. players
A.S.G. Nocerina players
S.S.C. Bari players
U.S. Avellino 1912 players
A.C. Perugia Calcio players
Novara F.C. players
Virtus Entella players
Italy youth international footballers
Sportspeople from the Metropolitan City of Turin